Michael Wüstefeld (born 12 September 1951) is a German writer.

Life 
Born in Dresden, Wüstefeld studied agricultural engineering at the TU Dresden from 1970 to 1974 and graduated with a diploma in engineering after passing the Abitur and the certificate for mechanical engineering. From 1974 to 1991 he worked as a technologist in an engineering office in Dresden. After unemployment in 1992 and a job as an office assistant, he has lived and worked as a freelance author and critic in Dresden since 1993.

He publishes lyric poetry and prose. In keeping with the other media-involving approach of his earliest publications in connection with prints, his work also includes a libretto. Wüstefeld's work has been and continues to be honored by numerous prizes and scholarships.

Since 1996 Wüstefeld has been a member of the PEN Centre Germany.

Work 
 Kinogeschichten. Dresden 2016 
 Fünfkirchen fünf vor zwölf. Ein Pécs-Tagebuch. Dresden 2016 
 Märchen von einem, den es als Schloßschreiber aufs Land zog.  Rheinsberg 2014 
 Paris geschenkt. Dresden, 2008 
 Das AnAlphabet. Göttingen, 2007
 Schlüsseloper : ein burleskes Spiel,  libretto for an opera by Wilfried Krätzschmar, world premiere 2 December 2006 in Dresden
 Blaues Wunder. Dresdens wunderlichste Brücke. Berlin, 2002
 Wegzehrung : Gedichte. Munich, 2001
 Schobers Zimmer : Erzählung. Dresden, 1998
 Deutsche Anatomie, Dülmen-Hiddingsel, 1996
 Amsterdamer Gedichte. Dresden, 1994
 Grenzstreifen. Warmbronn, 1993
 Nackt hinter der Schutzmaske : Erinnerungen. Aufbau-Verlag, 1990
 Stadtplan, Aufbau-Verlag, 1990
 Heimsuchung : Gedichte. Aufbau-Verlag, 1987
 grafiklyrik 2. 6 Gedichte mit 7 Holzschnitten von Peter Herrmann, 1979

Awards 
 1990: 
 1993: Scholarship 
 1997: Scholarship  
 1999: Scholarship  
 2007: Scholarship  
 2010: Scholarship of the 
 2012: Residence scholarship in Pécs
 2014: Stadtschreiber zu Rheinsberg

References

External links 
 
 Wuestefeld on literaturport

German male writers
Writers from Dresden
1951 births
Living people